Paṇḍita (Hindi: paṇḍit; Malaysian and Indonesian Malay: pendeta; Mongol: bandida; Javanese: pandhita, pêndhita, pêndheta, (pandito, pendito, pendeto); Tibetan: khepa; Wyl: mkhas pa), a Sanskrit word meaning learned master, may refer to:

Titles
 Pandita (Buddhism), a Buddhist teacher skilled in five sciences
 Agga Maha Pandita, an honorific title used in Theravada Buddhism
 Pandit, the Hindi variant, a broad term for teacher in the ancient and contemporary Indian context
 Pandita (Islam), a term for Muslim ritual specialists in the Philippines

People
 Balajinnatha Pandita (1916–2007), Sanskrit scholar
 Gadadhara Pandita, an associate of Hindu social reformer Chaitanya Mahaprabhu
 Lakshmana Pandita, 15th century Indian medical author
 Pandita Ramabai (1858–1922), Indian social reformer
 Sakya Pandita (1182–1251), 13th-century Tibetan Buddhist scholar
 Sayadaw U Pandita (1921–2016), Burmese Theravada master
 Zaya Pandita (1599–1662), Buddhist missionary priest and the most prominent Oirat Buddhist scholar

Other uses
 Pandita (butterfly), a brush-footed butterfly of tribe Limenitidini

See also
 Pundit (disambiguation)